Hermitage High School may refer to:

Hermitage High School (Arkansas) — Hermitage, Arkansas
Hermitage High School (Missouri) — Hermitage, Missouri
Hermitage High School (Virginia) — Richmond, Virginia